Yuri Leonidovich Ivanov (born 2 July 1959) is a former international speedway rider from the Soviet Union.

Speedway career 
Kazakov is a three times world champion after winning the gold medal at the Individual Ice Speedway World Championship in the 1986 Individual Ice Speedway World Championship, 1987 Individual Ice Speedway World Championship and 1992 Individual Ice Speedway World Championship.

In addition he won the Team Ice Racing World Championship seven times (1986, 1987, 1988, 1989, 1990, 1991 and 1992).

World final appearances

Ice World Championship
1984  Moscow, 3rd 27pts 
1985  Assen, 3rd 25pts
1986  Stockholm, champion 29pts 
1987  Berlin, champion 28pts
1988  Eindhoven, 2nd 27pts
1989  Almaty, 2nd 25pts 
1990  Göteborg, 11th 11pts
1991  Assen, 2nd 
1992  Frankfurt, champion 28pts
1993  Saransk, 11th 12pts
1995 10 Rounds GP, 17th

References 

1959 births
Living people
Russian speedway riders